WCBC-FM (107.1 FM) is a classic hits formatted broadcast radio station licensed to Keyser, West Virginia, serving the Cumberland/Frostburg "metro" area.  WCBC-FM is owned and operated by Cumberland Broadcasting Corporation.

History
WCBC-FM began in 1990 as WKZG, always owned by Cumberland Broadcasting Corporation.  The call letters were changed in 1994 to WCBC-FM, to match sister station WCBC 1270 AM. Previously, the WCBC-FM call letters were used between 1963-1969 by a Christian radio station in Baltimore, broadcasting on 105.7 MHz. The call letters stood for "Christian Broadcasting Company" and the station also used the advertising slogan "Where Christ Brings Comfort". That frequency is now WJZ-FM's in Baltimore.

Sports coverage
WCBC-FM is also the home of NASCAR Nationwide Series, Camping World Truck Series, and Sprint Cup racing.  WCBC carries all races from MRN Radio and PRN Radio, plus most (if not all) MRN and PRN programming.

Translator information
WCBC-FM had a translator in Cumberland on 99.5 FM.  The 99.5 signal was supplanted by the new, full-power station WVMD in April 2008.

Previous logo

References

External links

CBC-FM
CBC-FM